Andronovka is a station on the Moscow Central Circle of the Moscow Metro.

This station offers a transfer to the "Frezer" station of the urban/suburban rail line (one of 11 rail lines radiating from central Moscow). "Frezer" is on east-bound line that originates at the Kazansky railway station in central Moscow (so-called "Kazansky direction"). This line, just like any other, is served by commuter electric trains.

Upon the station's opening in September 2016, the only way to transfer is to exit the "Andronovka" station and walk outside for 3-5 minutes, across the "Kazansky" line tracks. But the pedestrian underpass and thus a more direct and convenient transfer is under construction.

Gallery

External links 
 
 Андроновка mkzd.ru

Moscow Metro stations
Railway stations in Russia opened in 2016
Moscow Central Circle stations